The Boquet River (or Bouquet River before a 1982 Board on Geographic Names decision) is a small river in upstate New York, United States.  The river flows into Lake Champlain at the east border of the Town of Willsboro in Essex County.

The Boquet River is 40 miles (64 kilometers) long.  Its source is in the Adirondack Mountains, within the Adirondack Park.

In 1814, during the War of 1812, a small battle was fought at the mouth of the river.

See also
List of rivers in New York

External links 

 Battle of Bouquet River

Adirondacks
Rivers of New York (state)
Rivers of Essex County, New York
Tributaries of Lake Champlain